Tenellia giarannae is a species of sea slug, an aeolid nudibranch, a marine gastropod mollusc in the family Fionidae.

Distribution
This species was described from the sewage outfall, McMurdo Sound, Ross Sea, Antarctica . It is also reported from Arrival Heights, McMurdo Sound, Ross Sea, Antarctica, .

References

Fionidae
Gastropods described in 2012